Otto Paul (O. P.) Kretzmann (May 7, 1901 – September 14, 1975) was a Lutheran pastor, professor, author, and long-tenured president of Valparaiso University.

Early life and education
Otto Paul Kretzmann was born in Stamford, Connecticut in 1901 and grew up in New York City in a Lutheran family. His father, grandfather, and five brothers were all Lutheran pastors. He was called 'John' by family and close friends, but later went by and published under his initials, 'O. P.'. Kretzmann graduated from Concordia Collegiate Institute in Bronxville, New York in 1920. He attended Concordia Seminary in St. Louis, Missouri and graduated in 1924 with a master's degree in sacred theology. Kretzmann later studied for, but did not finish, further graduate degrees at Columbia University, Johns Hopkins University, Harvard University, and the University of Chicago.

Career
From 1924 to 1934 Kretzmann was a faculty member at Concordia Theological Seminary, located at that time in Springfield, Illinois. He became executive secretary of the Walther League—an international Lutheran youth organization named for theologian C. F. W. Walther—in 1934, and served until 1940.

In 1940, Kretzmann became president of Valparaiso University in Valparaiso, Indiana, a position he held for 28 years. After stepping down from the presidency in 1968, he served as chancellor until 1974. Kretzmann was one of the most influential figures in the history of the university, presiding over a tenfold growth in enrollment. He was also one of the founders of The Cresset, the university's literature, public affairs, and arts review magazine.

O. P. Kretzmann had been awarded ten honorary doctoral degrees by the time of his death in 1975.

Published works
  A book of chapel devotions which were verbally delivered to participants of a summer camp between 1931 and 1935. The camp was for teenagers of the Central Illinois District of the Walther League, a Lutheran organization.
  - An anthology of articles from The Cresset, which was published by the Walther League.
 
 Several books of sermons
 Collections of devotionals, which Kretzmann called "Devotional Readings for Times of Change", including The Road Back to God

References

External links
 

1901 births
1975 deaths
20th-century American Lutheran clergy
Presidents of Valparaiso University
Clergy from New York City
Lutheran Church–Missouri Synod people
Writers from Stamford, Connecticut
Concordia College (New York) alumni
Concordia Seminary alumni
20th-century American academics